Love All You Have Left is a 2017 drama film written and directed by Matt Sivertson. The film stars Caroline Amiguet, Sara Wolfkind, Michael Christopher Shantz, Mike Burnell and Kathleen Sheehy. The story depicts Anne Frank surviving in the attic of a grieving family.

Plot
After losing her daughter in a school shooting, a woman finds a girl in her attic who says she is Anne Frank.

Cast
Caroline Amiguet as Juliette Forster
Sara Wolfkind as Anne Frank
Michael Christopher Shantz as Jeff Forster
Mike Burnell as Nazi Soldier
Kathleen Sheehy as Melanie Forster

Production

Much of the principal photography took place at the director's home in Pacific Beach, San Diego. In an interview with San Diego Reader, Sivertson said inspiration was discovered from the album In the Aeroplane Over the Sea by Neutral Milk Hotel. It contained references to Anne Frank and the songwriter felt haunted by her after reading The Diary of Anne Frank.

Release

The film screened at the Museum of Photographic Arts and San Diego Jewish Film Festival before a theatrical release in Los Angeles. It was distributed by Indie Rights.

Reception
San Diego Reader said "this is basically a two-hander." An article by The Forward, Talya Zax claims the idea of Anne Frank surviving is overdone. Kimber Myers at Los Angeles Times says "the issue isn't the lack of money; it's the choices made by the filmmakers."

References

External links
 
 
 
 
 

2017 films
Films about school violence
Films about Anne Frank
2017 biographical drama films
American biographical drama films
Films about Nazis
Films about families
Films shot in San Diego
Films set in San Diego
Films based on diaries
American films based on actual events
Films based on biographies
Films about grieving
Films about child death
2010s English-language films
2010s American films
Two-handers